HMS Roebuck was an R-class destroyer of the British Royal Navy that saw service during World War II. She was the fifteenth ship to carry this traditional ship name, after a small deer native to the British Isles, which was used as far back as the reign of Queen Elizabeth I.

Construction
Ordered in May 1940 from Scotts shipyard in Greenock, construction was delayed and she was not laid down until 19 June 1941. Roebuck then had the dubious honour of being launched prematurely by an air raid on 10 December 1942, her partially complete hulk lying submerged in the dockyard for three months before it was salvaged and completed in May 1943.

Service history

World War II

1943
After sea trials Roebuck was accepted into service on 10 June and assigned to the 11th Destroyer Flotilla of the Eastern Fleet, first taking passage to Scapa Flow to work-up with Home Fleet. In August she was prepared for foreign service and then took passage to Freetown, finally joining the Flotilla in the Indian Ocean in September, which was deployed for convoy defence and patrols.

1944
After being intercepted by aircraft Brake was scuttled by her own crew.

In June Roebuck was deployed with Fleet units off Burma and bombarded Martaban.
  
On 25 July she was deployed with the Flotilla as the screen for Eastern Fleet major units covering operations by the aircraft carriers  and  against targets at Sabang and Sumatra in "Operation Crimson".

In August Roebuck took passage to Simon's Town for a refit by HM Dockyard, rejoining the Flotilla at Trincomalee in November.

1945

On 1 May she took part in bombardments at Car Nicobar with the Flotilla in "Operation Bishop".

On 13 May Roebuck, Redoubt and Racehorse, escorted Nigeria from Trincomalee as Force 63, during a search for Japanese warships evacuating personnel from the Andaman and Nicobar Islands, and remained with the Fleet screen during the attacks on Japanese ships.

She then took part in bombardment of Nancowry.

In August Roebuck was preparing for large-scale landings in Malaya in "Operation Zipper", but the surrender of Japan brought hostilities to a close before they could be put into effect. She sailed to Singapore to support the re-occupation until sailing to Simon's Town in October to refit.

Post-war
Roebuck sailed from Simon's Town on 15 November 1945 on completion of the refit and arrived at Plymouth on 7 December. Early in 1946 she was deployed with the Local Flotilla and escorted the battleship  during a Royal Visit to the Channel Islands in June.

She was given the new pennant number F195.

On completion of the conversion in May 1953 she was recommissioned for service in the 5th Frigate Squadron, Mediterranean Fleet, and served abroad till July 1956 when placed in reserve at Plymouth. In 1953 she took part in the Fleet Review to celebrate the Coronation of Queen Elizabeth II.

During 1957 she refitted for training duties and joined the Dartmouth Training Squadron, replacing HMS Carron. She went into refit again in 1959. Recommissioned in May 1960 she joined the 17th Escort Squadron and remained on the operational list until returning to pay-off into reserve at Plymouth in 1962.

Disposal and fate
Before being placed on the Disposal List the ship was de-equipped at HM Dockyard Devonport before being used for underwater explosion trials at Rosyth by the Naval Construction Research Establishment (NCRE).

Roebuck was sold to the British Iron & Steel Corporation (BISCO) for demolition by Thos. W. Ward. She was towed to the breaker's yard at Inverkeithing on 8 August 1968.

Notes

Publications
 
 
 
 
 Marriott, Leo, Royal Navy Destroyers Since 1945. Ian Allan, 1989.

External links
 History: HMS Roebuck
 HMS Roebuck, Destroyer

 

Q and R-class destroyers of the Royal Navy
Ships built on the River Clyde
1942 ships
World War II destroyers of the United Kingdom
Type 15 frigates